Tetyana Valentynivna Khala (born May 6, 1987) is a Ukrainian swimmer, who specialized in butterfly events. She represented her nation Ukraine at the 2008 Summer Olympics, finishing in the top 30 of the women's 200 m butterfly.

Khala competed as a lone swimmer for the Ukrainian team in the women's 200 m butterfly at the 2008 Summer Olympics in Beijing. Leading up to the Games, she cleared a FINA B-standard entry time of 2:13.59 at the European Championships in Eindhoven, Netherlands. She challenged six other swimmers on the second heat including Singapore's Tao Li, who finished fifth in the 100 m butterfly final. She edged out Tao to take the fourth spot by 0.47 of a second in  2:12.16. Khala failed to advance into the semifinals, as she placed twenty-fourth overall in the prelims.

References

External links
NBC 2008 Olympics profile

1987 births
Living people
Ukrainian female swimmers
Olympic swimmers of Ukraine
Swimmers at the 2008 Summer Olympics
Female butterfly swimmers
Sportspeople from Dnipro
21st-century Ukrainian women